Leroy Arthur Coury (died 22 October 2012) was a Kittitian cricketer and businessman of Lebanese descent. He played in seven first-class matches for the Leeward Islands from 1964 to 1970.

See also
 List of Leeward Islands first-class cricketers

References

External links
 

Year of birth missing
2012 deaths
Kittitian cricketers
Leeward Islands cricketers
Caribbean people of Lebanese descent